The South Texas Family Residential Center is the largest immigrant detention center in the United States. Opened in December 2014 in Dilley, Texas, it has a capacity of 2,400 and is intended to detain mainly women and children from Central America.

On June 12, 2015, it was reported that the facility was holding 1,735 people, approximately 1,000 of which were children.  In filings dated September 30, 2018, the operator stated that the property was 100% full. By April 2019,  there were 499 women and children in the facility.

CoreCivic, previously called "Corrections Corporation of America", is seeking a license to operate the facility as a General Residential Operation but litigation was brought by Texas RioGrande Legal Aid on behalf of Grassroots Leadership and the detainees themselves to block the licensing by the Texas Department of Family and Protective Services.

Location and description

The site is located approximately 100 miles north of the Rio Grande and 70 miles southwest of San Antonio, southwest of Dilley, Texas, in Frio County. The address is 1925 W. Highway 85, Dilley, Texas, United States, zip code 78017.

The 50-acre site contains 80 small, tan-colored, two-bedroom, one-bathroom cottages in which the families will live. The cottages can house up to 8 people and contain bunk beds as well as baby cribs. They also have a flat-screen television. There is a kitchen, but cooking is not allowed in order to prevent fires. The cottages are connected by dirt roads.

There are also recreational and medical facilities, a school, trailer classrooms, a library, basketball court, playgrounds, and email access. A cafeteria is open for 12 hours a day, but snacks can be obtained at any hour.

The site was formerly a camp used by oilfield workers.

Detainees
The South Texas Family Residential Center was at first only able to accommodate 480 people when the first group of residents arrive in December 2014 from a Border Patrol training camp located in Artesia, New Mexico. The capacity was 2,400 residents by May 2014 with a staff of 600. It was will eventually planned to have a capacity of 3,000. It is intended to detain mostly women and children from Central America.

Administration
The facility opened in 2014 and is operated mainly by CoreCivic.

Local sources indicated the United States Government pays approximately $19 million monthly to operate the facility.

The operating cost of the facility will be $296 per person per day according to a statement made to reporters by an official at Immigration and Customs Enforcement.

The warden is Janice Killian.

See also
Willacy County Correctional Center - another major detention center in south Texas that is now closed due to a 2015 riot

References

External links
 www.southtexasfamilycenter.com
 www.cca.com/facilities/south-texas-family-residential-center

Immigration detention centers and prisons in the United States
Prisons in Texas
Private prisons in the United States
Buildings and structures in Frio County, Texas
2014 establishments in Texas
CoreCivic